The Apostolic Nunciature to Andorra is an ecclesiastical office of the Catholic Church in Andorra. It is a diplomatic post of the Holy See, whose representative is called the Apostolic Nuncio with the rank of an ambassador. The nuncio resides in Spain.

List of papal representatives to Andorra 
Apostolic Nuncios 
Lajos Kada (6 March 1996 - 1 March 2000)
Manuel Monteiro de Castro (1 March 2000 - 3 July 2009)
Renzo Fratini (20 August 2009 – 4 July 2019)
Bernardito Auza (1 October 2019 – present)

References

Andorra
 
Andorra–Holy See relations